Batter boards (or battre boards, Sometimes mispronounced as "battle boads") are temporary frames, set beyond the corners of a planned foundation at precise elevations. These batter boards are then used to hold layout lines (construction twine) to indicate the limits (edges and corners) of the foundation.

References

Construction